Mark Ellebracht (born March 31, 1981) is an American politician who has served in the Missouri House of Representatives from the 17th district since 2017.

Electoral history

State Representative

References

1981 births
Living people
Democratic Party members of the Missouri House of Representatives
21st-century American politicians